This is a list of members of the Privy Council of Canada from its inception at Canadian Confederation in 1867 until 1911.

Ministry

Macdonald
The Right Honourable Sir John Alexander Macdonald (from July 1, 1867)
The Honourable Sir George-Étienne Cartier (from July 1, 1867)
The Honourable Sir Samuel Leonard Tilley (from July 1, 1867)
The Honourable Sir Alexander Tilloch Galt (from July 1, 1867)
The Honourable William McDougall (from July 1, 1867)
The Honourable Sir William Pearce Howland (from July 1, 1867)
The Honourable Sir Adams George Archibald (from July 1, 1867)
The Honourable Adam Johnston Fergusson Blair (from July 1, 1867)
The Honourable Peter Mitchell (from July 1, 1867)
The Honourable Sir Alexander Campbell (from July 1, 1867)
The Honourable Jean Charles Chapais (from July 1, 1867)
The Honourable Sir Hector-Louis Langevin (from July 1, 1867)
The Honourable Sir Edward Kenny (from July 1, 1867)
The Right Honourable Sir John Rose (from November 18, 1867)
The Honourable Joseph Howe (from January 30, 1869)
The Honourable Sir Francis Hincks (from October 9, 1869)
The Honourable Christopher Dunkin (from November 16, 1869)
The Honourable Alexander Morris (from November 16, 1869)
The Honourable James Cox Aikins (from December 8, 1869)
The Right Honourable Sir Charles Tupper (from June 21, 1870)
The Honourable John Henry Pope (from October 25, 1871)
The Honourable John O'Connor (from  July 2, 1872)
The Honourable Théodore Robitaille (from January 30, 1873)
The Honourable Thomas Nicholson Gibbs (from June 14, 1873)
The Honourable Hugh McDonald (from August 13, 1873)

Mackenzie
The Honourable Alexander Mackenzie (from November 7, 1873)
The Honourable Sir Antoine-Aimé Dorion (from November 7, 1873)
The Honourable Dominick Edward Blake (from November 7, 1873)
The Honourable Sir Albert James Smith (from November 7, 1873)
The Honourable Luc Letellier de St. Just (from November 7, 1873)
The Right Honourable Sir Richard John Cartwright (from November 7, 1873)
The Honourable David Laird (from November 7, 1873)
The Honourable David Christie (from November 7, 1873)
The Honourable Isaac Burpee (from November 7, 1873)
The Honourable Donald Alexander Macdonald (from November 7, 1873)
The Honourable Thomas Coffin (from November 7, 1873)
The Honourable Télesphore Fournier (from November 7, 1873)
The Honourable William Ross (from November 7, 1873)
The Honourable Sir Richard William Scott (from November 7, 1873)
The Honourable Lucius Seth Huntington (from January 20, 1874)
The Honourable Félix Geoffrion (from July 8, 1874)
The Honourable William Berrian Vail (from September 30, 1874)
The Honourable Joseph-Édouard Cauchon (from December 7, 1875)
The Honourable David Mills (from October 24, 1876)
The Honourable Toussaint-Antoine-Rodolphe Laflamme (from November 9, 1876)
The Honourable Sir Charles Alphonse Pantaléon Pelletier (from January 26, 1877)
The Right Honourable Sir Wilfrid Laurier (from October 8, 1877)
The Honourable Alfred Gilpin Jones (from January 21, 1878)

Macdonald
The Honourable James McDonald (from October 17, 1878)
The Honourable Louis-François Rodrigue Masson (from October 19, 1878)
The Honourable James Colledge Pope (from October 19, 1878)
The Honourable Sir Mackenzie Bowell (from October 19, 1878)
The Honourable Louis François Georges Baby (from October 26, 1878)
The Honourable Robert Duncan Wilmot (from November 8, 1878)
The Honourable Sir David Lewis Macpherson (from February 11, 1880)
The Honourable Joseph-Philippe-René-Adolphe Caron (from November 8, 1880)
The Honourable Joseph-Alfred Mousseau (from November 8, 1880)
The Honourable Archibald McLelan (from May 20, 1881)
The Honourable Sir John Carling (from May 23, 1882)
The Honourable John Costigan (from May 23, 1882)
The Honourable Sir Joseph-Adolphe Chapleau (from July 29, 1882)
The Honourable Sir Frank Smith (from August 2, 1882)
The Honourable Thomas White (from August 5, 1885)
The Right Honourable Sir John Sparrow David Thompson (from September 26, 1885)
The Right Honourable Sir George Eulas Foster (from December 10, 1885)
The Honourable Sir John Joseph Caldwell Abbott (from May 13, 1887)
The Honourable Sir Charles Hibbert Tupper (from June 1, 1888)
The Honourable John Graham Haggart (from August 6, 1888)
The Honourable Edgar Dewdney (from September 25, 1888)
The Honourable Charles Carroll Colby (from November 28, 1888)
The Honourable Sir George Airey Kirkpatrick (from May 20, 1891)
The Honourable Joseph Aldéric Ouimet (from May 20, 1891)
The Honourable Amos Edwin Botsford (from June 1, 1891)
The Honourable William Miller (from June 1, 1891)
The Honourable George William Allan (from June 1, 1891)

Abbott
The Honourable James Colebrooke Patterson (from January 25, 1892)
The Honourable Sir Alexandre Lacoste (from October 13, 1892)
The Honourable Thomas Mayne Daly (from October 17, 1892)

Thompson
The Honourable Sir Auguste Réal Angers (from December 7, 1892)
The Honourable William Bullock Ives (from December 7, 1892)

Bowell
The Honourable Arthur Rupert Dickey (from December 21, 1894)
The Honourable Walter Humphries Montague (from December 21, 1894)
The Honourable Donald Ferguson (from January 2, 1895)
The Honourable John Fisher Wood (from December 24, 1895)
The Honourable Edward Gawler Prior (from January 15, 1896)
The Honourable Alphonse Desjardins (from January 15, 1896)
The Right Honourable Donald Alexander Smith (from April 24, 1896)

Tupper
The Honourable John Jones Ross (from May 1, 1896)
The Honourable Sir Louis Olivier Taillon (from May 1, 1896)
The Honourable Sir Hugh John Macdonald (from May 1, 1896)
The Honourable David Tisdale (from May 2, 1896)

Laurier
The Honourable Sir Oliver Mowat (from July 13, 1896)
The Right Honourable Sir Louis Henry Davies (from July 13, 1896*)
The Honourable Sir Frederick William Borden (from July 13, 1896)
The Right Honourable Sir William Mulock (from July 13, 1896)
The Honourable Sydney Arthur Fisher (from July 13, 1896)
The Honourable Joseph Israël Tarte (from July 13, 1896)
The Honourable Richard Reid Dobell (from July 13, 1896)
The Right Honourable William Stevens Fielding (from July 20, 1896)
The Honourable Andrew George Blair (from July 20, 1896)
The Honourable Christophe-Alphonse Geoffrion (from August 21, 1896)
The Honourable Sir Clifford Sifton (from November 17, 1896)
The Honourable Peter White (from March 24, 1897)
The Honourable Sir James David Edgar (from March 24, 1897)
The Honourable William Paterson (from June 30, 1897)
The Honourable Sir Henri-Gustave Joly de Lotbinière (from June 30, 1897)
The Honourable James Sutherland (from September 30, 1899)
The Honourable Michel-Esdras Bernier (from June 26, 1900)
The Right Honourable Sir Charles Fitzpatrick (from February 11, 1902)
The Honourable William Templeman (from February 25, 1902)
The Honourable Joseph-Raymond-Fournier Préfontaine (from November 11, 1902)
The Honourable Henry Robert Emmerson (from January 15, 1904)
The Honourable Louis-Philippe Brodeur (from January 19, 1904)
The Honourable Charles Smith Hyman (from February 5, 1904)
The Honourable Lawrence Geoffrey Power (from January 12, 1905)
The Honourable Napoléon Antoine Belcourt (from January 12, 1905)
The Honourable Frank Oliver (from April 8, 1905)
The Honourable Sir Allen Bristol Aylesworth (from October 10, 1905)
The Honourable Rodolphe Lemieux (from June 4, 1906)
The Honourable William Pugsley (from August 30, 1906)
The Right Honourable George Perry Graham (from August 30, 1906)
The Honourable Charles Murphy (from October 5, 1908)
The Right Honourable Raoul Dandurand (from January 20, 1909)
The Honourable Robert Franklin Sutherland (from January 20, 1909)
The Right Honourable William Lyon Mackenzie King (from June 2, 1909)
The Honourable Henri Sévérin Béland (from August 19, 1911)

See also
List of current members of the Queen's Privy Council for Canada
List of members of the Privy Council for Canada (1911–1948)
List of members of the Privy Council for Canada (1948–1968)
List of members of the Privy Council for Canada (1968–2005)
List of members of the Privy Council for Canada (2006–present)

References

 }

1867-1911